was a town located in Taga District, Ibaraki Prefecture, Japan.

As of 2003, the town had an estimated population of 13,373 and a density of 185.43 persons per km². The total area was 72.12 km².

On November 1, 2004, Jūō was merged into the expanded city of Hitachi and no longer exists as an independent municipality.

External links
 Official website of Hitachi  (some English content)

Dissolved municipalities of Ibaraki Prefecture
Hitachi, Ibaraki